Slovenia competed at the 2014 Summer Youth Olympics, in Nanjing, China from 16 August to 28 August 2014.

Medalists

Archery

Slovenia qualified a male archer from its performance at the 2013 World Archery Youth Championships. Slovenia later qualified a female archer from its performance at the 2014 European Archery Youth Championships.

Individual

Team

Athletics

Slovenia qualified four athletes.

Qualification Legend: Q=Final A (medal); qB=Final B (non-medal); qC=Final C (non-medal); qD=Final D (non-medal); qE=Final E (non-medal)

Girls
Field events

Badminton

Slovenia qualified two athletes based on the 2 May 2014 BWF Junior World Rankings.

Singles

Doubles

Basketball

Slovenia qualified a boys' and girls' team from their performance at the 2013 3x3 World Tour Final.

Skills Competition

Boys' Tournament

Roster
 Gregor Klobčar
 Milan Kovačevič
 Žiga Lah
 Aljaž Slutej

Group stage

Knockout Stage

Girls' Tournament
Roster
 Maruša Derlink
 Althea Gwashavanhu
 Ela Mićunović
 Maruša Seničar

Group stage

Canoeing

Slovenia qualified two boats based on its performance at the 2013 World Junior Canoe Sprint and Slalom Championships.

Boys

Cycling

Slovenia qualified a boys' and girls' team based on its ranking issued by the UCI.

Team

Mixed Relay

Golf

Slovenia qualified one team of two athletes based on the 8 June 2014 IGF Combined World Amateur Golf Rankings.

Individual

Team

Handball

Slovenia qualified a boys team by winning the gold medal at the 2013 European Youth Summer Olympic Festival.

Boys' tournament

Roster

 Jakob Beđet
 Rok Cvetko
 Blaž Janc
 Urh Kastelic
 Aleks Kavčič
 Luka Kikanović
 Matic Kotar
 Jaka Malus
 Gal Marguč
 Jan Prevolnik
 Leon Rašo
 Tilen Sokolič
 Darko Stojnić
 Žiga Urbič

Group stage

Semifinals

Gold-medal match

Judo

Slovenia qualified one athlete based on its performance at the 2013 Cadet World Judo Championships.

Individual

Team

Rowing

Slovenia qualified one boat based on its performance at the 2013 World Rowing Junior Championships.

Qualification Legend: FA=Final A (medal); FB=Final B (non-medal); FC=Final C (non-medal); FD=Final D (non-medal); SA/B=Semifinals A/B; SC/D=Semifinals C/D; R=Repechage

Sailing

Slovenia was given a reallocation boat based on being a top ranked nation not yet qualified.

Shooting

Slovenia was given a wild card to compete.

Individual

Team

Swimming

Slovenia qualified four swimmers.

Boys

Girls

Mixed

Taekwondo

Slovenia qualified one athlete based on its performance at the Taekwondo Qualification Tournament.

Boys

References

2014 in Slovenian sport
Nations at the 2014 Summer Youth Olympics
Slovenia at the Youth Olympics